Christiane Nuss  (born December 31, 1943) at Strasbourg) is a former French athlete, who specialised in the shot put.

Biography  
She won two championship titles of France shot put in 1964 and 1965.

prize list  
 French Championships in Athletics   :  
 2 times winner of the shot put in 1964 and 1965.

Records

notes and references  
 Docathlé2003, Fédération française d'athlétisme, 2003, p. 423

1943 births
Living people
Sportspeople from Strasbourg
French female shot putters